Woodfibre, originally Britannia West, was a pulp mill and at one time a small company town, on the west side of upper Howe Sound near Squamish, British Columbia. The mill closed in March 2006.

History
In 1912, a mill opened at the site where Mill Creek empties into Howe Sound. The townsite of Woodfibre was soon constructed at the remote location, which was accessible only by boat.

The community was named by Sir George Bury, president of Whalen Pulp and Paper Company when the mill was built in 1920.
 
The mill was owned by Alaska Pine and Cellulose Ltd when, in December 1954, that company was purchased by Rayonier Inc.  Rayonier operated the mill under the Alaska Pine and Cellulose name until 1959, when the company name was changed to Rayonier Canada, Ltd.  Rayonier continued to operate the mill until 1980, when the company exited the pulp business in western Canada and divested the company to Western Forest Products.

Until the 1960s, whole families lived, worked and were partially educated at Woodfibre. At that time, the townsite began to be demolished, and families moved to other nearby communities such as Squamish and Britannia Beach.
Mill owner Western Forest Products provided ferry service, by way of the MV Garibaldi II, an identical design to smaller BC Ferries, until the mill's closure in 2006.

In January 2013, Western Forest Products announced that it has entered into a conditional agreement for the sale of its former Woodfibre Pulp Mill site for the purchase price of $25.5 million. The net proceeds from the sale are expected to be approximately $17 million 

In 2015, the site is undergoing an environmental assessment for use as a liquefied natural gas plant.  That was approved in 2016 and Woodfibre LNG received an export license as well.  The $1.6 billion LNG plant is expected to be operational by 2020.  In March 2020, construction was delayed until 2021.

Construction work finally started in June 2022, with site clearance and preparation work being undertaken by Graham Infrastructure on behalf of EPC Contractor McDermott International.

Hydroelectric Dam
In operation since 1947, it generates 2.6 MW of electricity with a single pelton wheel.

Gallery

See also
Darrell Bay

References

External links
 MV Garibaldi II, ferry history
 Aerial view of Woodfibre, Mount Elphinstone in background from Randall & Kat's Flying   Photos website
 

Unincorporated settlements in British Columbia
Ghost towns in British Columbia
Company towns in Canada
Populated places in the Squamish-Lillooet Regional District
Sea-to-Sky Corridor